(born 18 June 1998) is a German-born Slovak soprano. She was the winner of the Czech–Slovak television show  in November 2010 and became famous through the broadcasting of CNN television shortly after winning.

Early life
Patricia was born in Münchberg, Germany to Slovak parents. Shortly after, her family moved to Ostrava in the Czech Republic. She has been singing since she was four years old. Having graduated from primary school, she began studying at the Janáček Academy of Music and Performing Arts.

Professional career 
Her first public performance was at the Antonín Dvořák Theatre, where she performed for the first time with the Janáček Philharmonic Orchestra. Subsequent to this, she went on to win the Talentmania TV show and then released her début album. In 2014, she won the international singing competition at the Concorso Internazionale di Musica Sacra in Rome.

In 2015, she got a standing ovation in rendering Once Upon a Time in the West at the Rudolfinum, Prague.
Today, she still performs in public whilst studying privately with Czech soprano, .

In 2017, she performed Galatea in Acis and Galatea with Collegium Marianum as part of the Janáček Music Festival.

Cancer diagnosis and career hiatus
On 10 February 2022, Janečková announced on her Instagram page that she had been diagnosed with breast cancer and would be taking a career hiatus for an undetermined length of time.

According to her social media accounts, after chemotherapy and operation she is healthy again, and back on stage.

References

External links

"About Patricia Janečková", GoOut.net

Living people
1998 births
Slovak sopranos
21st-century Slovak singers
People from Hof (district)
Opera crossover singers